The first season of the television comedy series The Middle aired on ABC from September 30, 2009 to May 19, 2010. The season was produced by Blackie and Blondie Productions and Warner Bros. Television with series creators DeAnn Heline and Eileen Heisler serving as executive producers.

The show revolves around Frances "Frankie" Heck (Patricia Heaton), a working-class, Midwestern woman who resides with her husband Mike (Neil Flynn) in the small fictional town of Orson, Indiana. Frankie and Mike are the parents of three children, Axl (Charlie McDermott), Sue (Eden Sher), and Brick (Atticus Shaffer).

After airing only 2 episodes, ABC gave the show a full season pickup. The Middle was then renewed for a second season on January 12, 2010.

The first episode premiered to 8.707 million viewers, a 5.4/9 household rating and a 2.6/8 adults 18-49 rating. It beat out the CBS sitcom, Gary Unmarried, and the NBC drama, Mercy, both of which aired in the same timeslot.

Cast

Main cast
 Patricia Heaton as Frankie Heck
 Neil Flynn as Mike Heck
 Charlie McDermott as Axl Heck
 Eden Sher as Sue Heck
 Atticus Shaffer as Brick Heck
 Chris Kattan as Bob

Recurring cast
 Brock Ciarlelli as Brad, Sue's ex-boyfriend and later friend.
 Blaine Saunders as Carly, Sue's best friend.
 Jen Ray as Nancy Donahue, the Hecks' neighbor.
 Beau Wirick as Sean Donahue, Axl's friend.
 Brian Doyle-Murray as Don Elhert, owner of the car dealership where Frankie and Bob work.

Guest cast
 Patricia Belcher as Mrs. Rettig, Brick's teacher. She appears in "Pilot".
 Vicki Lewis as Mrs. Barry, a social worker who visits the Heck household. She appears in "The Scratch".
 Mary-Pat Green as Mrs. Larimer, the principal of Orson Elementary. She appears in "The Scratch".
 John Cullum as Big Mike, Mike's father. He appears in "Thanksgiving".
 Brooke Shields as Rita Glossner, the Hecks' uncouth and troubled neighbor. She appears in "The Neighbor".
 Amy Sedaris as Abby Michaels, a motivator at Frankie's job. She appears in "The Fun House".
 Alexa Vega as Morgan, Axl's girlfriend. She appears in "The Break-Up" and "Worry Duty".
 Marsha Mason as Pat Spence, Frankie's mother. She appears in "Mother's Day".
 Betty White as Mrs. Nethercott, Brick's school librarian. She appears in "Average Rules".

Episodes

Ratings

References

The Middle (TV series)
2009 American television seasons
2010 American television seasons